Group A of UEFA Euro 1996 was one of four groups in the final tournament's initial group stage. It began on 8 June and was completed on 18 June. The group consisted of hosts England, Switzerland, the Netherlands and Scotland.

England won the group and advanced to the quarter-finals, along with the Netherlands. Scotland and Switzerland failed to advance.

Teams

Standings

In the quarter-finals,
The winner of Group A, England, advanced to play the runner-up of Group B, Spain.
The runner-up of Group A, Netherlands, advanced to play the winner of Group B, France.

Matches

England vs Switzerland

Netherlands vs Scotland

Switzerland vs Netherlands

Scotland vs England

Scotland vs Switzerland

Netherlands vs England

References

External links
UEFA Euro 1996 Group A

Group A
Group
Group
Group
Group
England–Scotland football rivalry